This is a list of Galaxy Angel episodes.

Episodes

Galaxy Angel

Galaxy Angel Z

Galaxy Angel A/AA

Galaxy Angel A and AA are both considered to be Galaxy Angel series three. Aside from their openings and endings, there is no difference between them and their episode numbers do not reset after the change.

Galaxy Angel A

Galaxy Angel AA

Note: Series AA is still part of Galaxy Angel series three. The only difference is the OP/ED.

Galaxy Angel S

Series S was a special that aired between AA and X.

Galaxy Angel X
The English dub cuts off after the 8th episode of the final season.

Music
Opening theme
Galaxy★Bang! Bang! by Angel-tai (Ryōko Shintani, Yukari Tamura, Miyuki Sawashiro, Mayumi Yamaguchi)

References

Galaxy Angel
Galaxy Angel